Ukrspecexport (an abbreviation of "Ukrainian Special Export") is a Ukrainian state-owned arms trading company and part of the state conglomerate Ukrainian Defense Industry. Ukrspecexport was formed in November 1996 by merging Ukroboronservice and Ukrinmash. It is a subsidiary of Ukroboronprom.

Ukrspecexport SC not only sells the products of the Ukrainian arms industry, but also the excess weapons of the Armed Forces of Ukraine inherited from the Soviet Armed Forces. Since February 2011 the company also produces non-military firearms and ammunition for them.

In documents uncovered during the United States diplomatic cables leak U.S.-diplomats complained the U.S. is fighting a constant battle to stop the flow of arms from Ukraine and Ukrspecexport to terrorists in the Middle East and South Sudan.

On August 10, 2019, the Ukrainian state company Ukrspetsexport and the Turkish Baykar Defense established a joint venture in the field of high-precision weapons and aerospace technology.

In 2023, Ukrspecexport was listed by the Special Advisory Council for Myanmar as being among the companies that had assisted the weapons production of Myanmar's military junta and could be at risk of being complicit in its violation of human rights.

References

External links 
 Ukrspecexport Official website

Defence companies of Ukraine
Military of Ukraine
Ukrainian brands
Ukroboronprom
Ukrainian companies established in 1996